The 1928 Colorado College Tigers football team represented Colorado College as a member of the Rocky Mountain Conference (RMC) during the 1928 college football season. In its third year under head coach William T. Van de Graaff, the team compiled an overall record of 5–3 with an identical mark in conference play, placing fifth in the RMC. Dutch Clark rushed for 1,349 yards on 135 carries and scored 103 of CC's 203 points. He became the first All-American football player from any of Colorado's colleges and universities.

Schedule

References

Colorado College
Colorado College Tigers football seasons
Colorado College Tigers football